This is a list of countries by mobile banking usage as measured by the percentage of the population. Mobile banking is generally defined as a service provided a financial institution that allows its customers to conduct financial transactions remotely using a mobile device. The following table contains data sourced from both World Bank and Bain & Company.

List of countries by mobile banking usage

See also 

List of countries by Internet connection speeds
List of countries by smartphone penetration
List of countries by number of mobile phones in use
List of mobile network operators
List of countries by number of Internet users

References 

Mobile banking usage
 Banking
Mobile
Banking-related lists
Telecommunications lists